The Mimika River is a river in Western New Guinea.

The Mimika language is spoken in the region.

See also
List of rivers of Western New Guinea
Mimika language

References

Rivers of Papua (province)